Mohammadabad-e Bab Skakan (also Romanized as Moḩammadābād-e Bāb Skākān; also known as Moḩammadābād) is a village in Sarduiyeh Rural District, Sarduiyeh District, Jiroft County, Kerman Province, Iran. At the 2006 census, its population was 418, in 72 families.

References 

Populated places in Jiroft County